The Florida Midland Railway Company was incorporated under the general incorporation laws of Florida, and surveyed a line from Lake Jessup, in Orange County, to Leesburg, in Lake County.

History
The company was reincorporated on February 10, 1885; only  had been graded.  The new owners were E. W. Henck, S. M. Breuster, Carl Cushing, A. Menser and C. E. Munson of Florida, and Edward Page, Charles W. Morris and Cyrus Carpenter of Boston, Massachusetts.

The line was extended

Land grants were promised, as long as part of the railroad was completed within a year.

Florida state law chapter 3795, approved June 2, 1887, expanded the area from which land grants could be chosen, and extended the deadline to June 1, 1888.

The line actually built was rather different, running from Clifton on Lake Jesup west to Apopka, but then turning south to Kissimmee.

The railroad's track was  while it was independent, but when it was taken over by the Plant System in the late 1890s, all track north of the  narrow gauge section of the Sanford and St. Petersburg Railroad (also taken over by the Plant System) was abandoned and the remaining trackage from Clarcona to Kissimmee was converted to  narrow gauge.  The two narrow gauge lines were run in conjunction with one another, allowing the usage of the same narrow gauge equipment on both lines.  The Plant System became part of the Atlantic Coast Line Railroad system in 1902.

Current conditions

From Clifton to Apopka, the railroad has been abandoned for over 100 years. Virtually no trace of this section remains, but parts of the right-of-way were used to construct SR 434.

From Apopka to Clarcona, the right-of-way is used for the West Orange Trail.

From Clarcona to Ocoee, the right-of-way is currently owned by CSX Transportation and run by the Florida Central Railroad.

From Ocoee to Kissimmee, the railroad is abandoned, and some elements remain.

Stations
These are listed from north to south.

See also
List of Atlantic Coast Line Railroad precursors

References

Defunct Florida railroads
Predecessors of the Atlantic Coast Line Railroad
Railway companies established in 1883
Railway companies disestablished in 1896
Narrow gauge railroads in Florida
3 ft gauge railways in the United States
1883 establishments in Florida